ACOD may refer to:
 Adjournment in contemplation of dismissal, specific judicial order usually followed only by paperwork and ending of the legal process 
 British Advisory Committee for Older and Disabled People, within Office of Communications (AKA Ofcom)
 A.C.O.D. (Adult Children of Divorce), 2013 American comedy film